James Cahill is a British art critic, academic, and author.

Cahill was born in London. He earned a degree in Classics and English at Magdalen College, Oxford, followed by a master's degree in Contemporary Art from the Courtauld Institute. In 2017, he completed a PhD in Classics at Cambridge University. He is a Leverhulme Early Career Fellow at King's College London.

He has written for publications including Apollo, The Burlington Magazine, The London Review of Books and The Times Literary Supplement.

In 2022, his debut novel, Tiepolo Blue, was published. The Guardian called it 
"a bold debut of psychosexual awakening".

Publications
Flying Too Close to the Sun, Phaidon Press, 2018
The Classical Now, Elephant Publishing, 2018, with Michael Squire and Ruth Allen
Tiepolo Blue, Sceptre, 2022

References

Living people
British non-fiction writers
Year of birth missing (living people)